Robert Paul Griffin (November 6, 1923 – April 16, 2015) was an American politician. A member of the Republican Party, he represented Michigan in the  United States House of Representatives and United States Senate and was a Justice of the Michigan Supreme Court. He co-sponsored the Landrum-Griffin Act, which regulates the internal affairs of labor unions. As a deputy minority leader in the Senate, he called on President Richard Nixon, a fellow Republican, to resign during the Watergate scandal.

Early life 
Griffin was born in Detroit, Michigan and attended public schools in Garden City and Dearborn. During the Second World War, he enlisted in the 71st Infantry Division in 1943 and spent fourteen months in Europe. After the war, he graduated from Central Michigan College (now Central Michigan University) in Mount Pleasant in 1947. He received a law degree from the University of Michigan Law School and was admitted to the bar in 1950. He commenced the practice of law in Traverse City.

Career 
Griffin was elected as a Republican to the U.S. House of Representatives from Michigan's 9th congressional district in 1956, unseating incumbent Ruth Thompson in the Republican primary. Griffin served in the House during the Eighty-fifth United States Congress as well as the four succeeding Congresses, a period spanning January 3, 1957 until May 10, 1966. After the revelations of the McClellan Committee, which investigated corruption and organized crime influence in labor unions, he and Rep. Phil Landrum sponsored the Labor Management Reporting and Disclosure Act of 1959 also known as the Landrum-Griffin Act. He later supported Gerald Ford as the Republican Conference Chairman and later, the House Minority Leader. During his tenure in the House, Griffin voted in favor of the Civil Rights Acts of 1960 and 1964, as well as the 24th Amendment to the U.S. Constitution and the Voting Rights Act of 1965, but did not vote on the Civil Rights Act of 1957.

He resigned May 10, 1966 to take a seat in the United States Senate. Following the death of Sen. Patrick V. McNamara, Michigan Governor George Romney appointed him for the remainder of McNamara's term. In the 1966 election, he won election to a full term, defeating former Governor Soapy Williams by a 56% to 44% margin. He defeated Attorney General Frank J. Kelley in the 1972 election for a second term.

In 1968, Griffin led a successful filibuster against the nomination of Supreme Court Associate Justice Abe Fortas to be elevated to the position of Chief Justice, charging President (and former Senate Majority Leader) Lyndon B. Johnson with cronyism, noting the close relationship between the two. Fortas resigned his Associate Justice seat in May 1969 when it was discovered Fortas had been paid a $20,000 a year retainer by Louis Wolfson, a close friend and former client, since 1966. Griffin voted in favor of the Civil Rights Act of 1968 and the confirmation of Thurgood Marshall to the U.S. Supreme Court. He became the Republican Whip in the Senate on September 24, 1969, and served until 1977.

In 1974, he wrote to President Richard Nixon to inform him that if the White House did not release tapes that the Watergate Committee subpoenaed, the President would face impeachment and trial in the Senate. He also told the President that he considered the failure to comply with the subpoena as an impeachable offense. Up to that point, Griffin had been a supporter of the President.

Griffin was an unsuccessful candidate for reelection in 1978, narrowly defeated by former Detroit City Council president Carl Levin. He initially announced in April 1977 that he would not run for re-election in 1978, saying that he was tired and that Washington needed new blood. He went on to miss a third of the votes in 1977. He changed his mind later in the campaign and Levin used his own words and his attendance record against him during the campaign.

Later, Griffin served as a justice of the Michigan Supreme Court from 1987 to 1994. His son, Richard Allen Griffin, was a judge on the Michigan Court of Appeals from 1989 to 2005, when he was appointed by President George W. Bush to the United States Court of Appeals for the Sixth Circuit.

During the elder Griffin's first Senate campaign in 1966, a suburban Detroit rock band, Doug Brown and the Omens, released a promotional flexidisc in support of Griffin's candidacy. The song, "Give Bob The Ball" (which extolled Griffin's "youth and experience") has been included on the garage rock compilation album Friday At The Hideout.

Personal life and death 
Griffin was a resident of Traverse City, in Northern Michigan. He married Marjorie Anderson of Ludington in 1947. Together, they had four children, including Richard Griffin. Griffin died on April 16, 2015, aged 91. He is buried at Linwood Cemetery near Traverse City's Long Lake.

Bibliography 
 Griffin, Robert P. "The Landrum-Griffin Act: Twelve Years of Experience in Protecting Employee Rights." Georgia Law Review 5 (summer 1971): 622–42
 Griffin, Robert P. "Rules and Procedure of the Standing Committees." In We Propose: A Modern Congress, edited by Mary McInnis, pp. 37–53. New York: McGraw-Hill, 1966.

References

External links 
 Presentation of the Portrait of the Honorable Robert P. Griffin

 

|-

|-

|-

|-

|-

1923 births
2015 deaths
20th-century American judges
20th-century American politicians
American Congregationalists
Central Michigan University alumni
Fordson High School alumni
Justices of the Michigan Supreme Court
People from Mount Pleasant, Michigan
People from Traverse City, Michigan
Politicians from Detroit
Republican Party members of the United States House of Representatives from Michigan
Republican Party United States senators from Michigan
United States Army personnel of World War II
United States Army soldiers
University of Michigan Law School alumni